(born April 17, 1976) is a Japanese former professional baseball player.    He played for the Hiroshima Toyo Carp in the Central League

References

Living people
1976 births
Japanese baseball players
Nippon Professional Baseball pitchers
Hiroshima Toyo Carp players